Pele Koljonen (born 25 July 1988) is a retired Finnish footballer. He played in the Finnish premier division Veikkausliiga for KuPS and MYPA.

Koljonen is the son of former Finnish international Atik Ismail.

References
Guardian Football

1988 births
Living people
Finnish footballers
Finnish people of Tatar descent
Finnish Muslims
Kuopion Palloseura players
Myllykosken Pallo −47 players
Veikkausliiga players
Association football forwards
Finland under-21 international footballers
People from Kuopio
Sportspeople from North Savo